Relations between Ukraine and the Commonwealth of Independent States (CIS) are multilateral international relations between a third state and a supranational organization.

On December 7–8, 1991, a meeting was held on the territory of the Republic of Belarus, in the Biełaviežskaja Pušča near Brest, the result of which was the official confirmation of the dissolution of the Soviet Union and the conclusion of an agreement on the formation of the CIS. However, Ukraine did not sign or ratify the subsequent CIS charter, which was agreed to in 1993, thus Ukraine has never been a member of the CIS, having only the status of a founding state of the CIS. Ukraine ended its participation in the statutory bodies of the CIS in 2018 due to the protracted Russo-Ukrainian War, although it remains a member of the Commonwealth of Independent States Free Trade Area.

After the beginning of the Russian invasion of Ukraine during the Russo-Ukrainian War, Russia–Ukraine relations were completely broken, and Belarus–Ukraine relations, due to the Belarusian involvement in the 2022 Russian invasion of Ukraine as an ally of the Russian Federation, deteriorated extremely. Moreover, Ukraine began intensive denunciation of various agreements with the CIS due to European integration and the process of joining the European Union.

History

1990s 

On December 7–8, 1991, the chairman of the Supreme Council of Belarus Stanislaŭ Šuškievič, the President of the Russian Federation Boris Yeltsin and the President of Ukraine Leonid Kravchuk met on the territory of the Republic of Belarus, in the Biełaviežskaja Pušča near Brest. Its result was the official confirmation of the fact of the dissolution of the Soviet Union, the conclusion of an agreement on the formation of the CIS. On December 21, 1991, at a meeting in Almaty, the leaders of Ukraine,  Russia, Belarus, Azerbaijan, Armenia, Moldova, Kazakhstan, Kyrgyzstan, Turkmenistan, Uzbekistan, and Tajikistan signed the Protocol on the Formation of the CIS.

Ukraine was one of the founders of the Commonwealth of Independent States and developed cooperation with the CIS states on the basis of the Agreement on the Establishment of the Commonwealth of Independent States of December 8, 1991 and the Protocol to this Agreement of December 21, 1991, which is an integral part of it, subject to reservations, expressed by the Verkhovna Rada of Ukraine during the ratification of the specified Agreement and the Statement of the Verkhovna Rada of Ukraine dated December 20, 1991 "Concerning Ukraine's conclusion of the Agreement on the Commonwealth of Independent States", which provides an official interpretation of the Agreement and reservations. The Application states that:

 According to its legal status, Ukraine is and remains an independent state – a subject of international law.
 Ukraine denies the transformation of the Commonwealth of Independent States into a state entity with its own authorities and administration.
 Ukraine denies granting the Commonwealth of Independent States the status of a subject of international law.
 Coordinating institutes within the framework of the commonwealth cannot have an authoritative character, their decisions are advisory.
 Carrying out foreign policy independently, Ukraine will enter into consultations with other states of the commonwealth.
 The border between Ukraine on the one hand and Russia and Belarus on the other is the state border of Ukraine, which is inviolable.
 Ukraine will create its own Armed Forces based on the Armed Forces of the former USSR located on its territory.
 Ukraine will strive to acquire the status of a nuclear-free state by destroying all nuclear arsenals under effective international control and, based on the Declaration on State Sovereignty of Ukraine, will not join military blocs.
 The presence of strategic armed forces on the territory of Ukraine is temporary. Their legal status and term of stay on the territory of Ukraine should be determined by the law of Ukraine and a special intergovernmental agreement concluded between the states on the territory of which the nuclear weapons of the former USSR are located.
 Ukraine will create its own open economic system by introducing its own currency, creating its own banking and customs systems, developing its own transport and communication systems, as well as participating in regional and interregional markets.
 Disputes regarding the interpretation and application of the provisions of the Agreement will be resolved by Ukraine through negotiations on the basis of international law.
 Ukraine reserves the right not only to suspend, but also to terminate its participation in the Agreement or its individual articles.
 Ukraine guarantees the fulfillment of international obligations arising for it from the treaties of the former Union of the SSR, in accordance with its national legislation.

CIS member states closely cooperate in the field of international legal assistance and cooperation. In particular, on January 22, 1993, the heads of the CIS member states, including Ukraine, signed the Convention on Legal Assistance and Legal Relations in Civil, Family and Criminal Matters, and on March 29, 1997, the Protocol to it.

After the collapse of the USSR and the emergence of new independent states, a number of environmental problems arose that were previously domestic, but today have become international in nature and require the coordination of the efforts of the newly independent states. In this regard, the CIS states concluded a number of international agreements on the implementation of joint environmental protection measures, the provision of mutual assistance in the elimination of the consequences of environmental disasters and other emergency situations.

Thus, on February 8, 1992, Ukraine signed the Agreement on Cooperation in the Field of Ecology and Environmental Protection; June 4, 1999 – Agreement on cooperation in the field of conservation and use of genetic resources of cultivated plants of CIS member states; November 30, 2000 – Agreement on cooperation in the field of training specialists in radioecology, radiation safety, radiobiology and related sciences.

As noted, Ukraine prioritizes economic cooperation within the CIS. One of the main tasks solved within the framework of the CIS is the preservation and development of close economic ties between the CIS member states. The basic documents on economic issues within the Commonwealth are the Agreement on the Establishment of the Economic Union (Ukraine has not signed the Agreement) and the Agreement on the Creation of a Free Trade Zone (the Agreement was signed by Ukraine on 04/15/1999 and ratified by the Verkhovna Rada by adopting the Law of 10/06/1999). The agreement on the establishment of the Economic Union was signed on September 24, 1993. The document envisages the gradual formation of the union with the aim of integrating the economy and creating a single customs and currency area based on market relations.

In accordance with Article 30 of this Treaty, a state that expresses its willingness to assume only part of the obligations under this Treaty with the consent of the members of the Economic Union may be granted the status of an associate member. The conditions for joining the Economic Union as an associate member are determined by the members of the Economic Union. On April 15, 1994, Ukraine and the countries of the Economic Union signed the Agreement on the accession of Ukraine to the Economic Union as an associate member. That is, Ukraine was an associate member of the Economic Union.

The creation of a free trade zone in the CIS, taking into account the interests of all partners of the Commonwealth, is of key importance in the mutual economic relations of the CIS member states.

On April 15, 1994, the Agreement on the establishment of a free trade zone was signed, and on April 2, 1999, the Protocol to it was signed. Ukraine ratified the said Agreement and the Protocol to it by adopting the Law of Ukraine dated October 6, 1999 No. 1125-ХІV.

2000s 

On October 7, 2002, Ukraine signed a new version of the Convention on Legal Assistance and Legal Relations in Civil, Family, and Criminal Matters at a meeting of the Council of Heads of State of the CIS.

On December 10, 2002, at a meeting of the working group of representatives of the CIS member states on the preparation of proposals for the development of cooperation between the CIS member states in the economic sphere, Ukraine proposed to dedicate 2003 in the CIS to the implementation of specific tasks and the practical implementation of the adopted documents. In this regard, Ukraine formulated the following priority tasks:

 complete the legal registration of the free trade zone and organize its regulatory and legal framework;
 start using the basic norms and rules of free trade, analyze the application of norms regarding the free trade zone in the legislation of the participating states;
 to carry out constant monitoring of processes;
 complete the development of agreements that regulate trade in services, provision of trade subsidies, transport infrastructure in international transport corridors, as well as concepts of transport policy and cooperation in the currency sphere.

It is also decisive that since January 2003, according to the Decision of the Council of Heads of State of the CIS, the chairmanship of the Council of Heads of State of the Commonwealth was carried out by Ukraine in the person of its President of Ukraine Leonid Kuchma.

2010s 

April 8, 2013 First Deputy Prime Minister of Ukraine Serhii Arbuzov was appointed the National Coordinator of Ukraine for cooperation within the Commonwealth of Independent States, as well as the representative of Ukraine in the Economic Council of the Commonwealth of Independent States.

As stipulated by the Decision of the Council of Heads of State of the CIS of October 25, 2013, Ukraine was appointed to preside over the CIS in 2014.

Among the priorities of the presidency of Ukraine in the CIS in 2014, which was based on the principle of equality, partnership interaction and strengthening of good-neighborly relations between the CIS member states, the foreign policy, economic, humanitarian, scientific, technical and innovative spheres of activity of the Commonwealth, transport, energy were determined, fighting against new challenges and threats.

Russo-Ukrainian War 

However, starting from February 27, 2014, after the Russian Federation threatened to violate the territorial integrity of Ukraine, the use of a military contingent of the Armed Forces of the Russian Federation on the territory of the ARC, the announcement of an illegitimate referendum on the independence of Crimea and other illegal actions Russia, Ukraine, as the presiding state in the CIS, initiated an urgent convocation on March 7 of this year. in Kyiv, an extraordinary meeting of the Council of Ministers of Foreign Affairs of the CIS, the purpose of which was to adopt the relevant Statement of the Ministry of Foreign Affairs on the situation in certain regions of Ukraine, including the Autonomous Republic of Crimea.

However, the Commonwealth of Independent States, unlike other international organizations (United Nations, European Union, Council of Europe, Organization for Security and Co-operation in Europe), avoided making responsible political decisions regarding the basic principles of the Commonwealth's existence. Taking this into account, the Ukrainian side, in a note of the Ministry of Foreign Affairs of Ukraine dated 03/19/2014, announced the termination of the CIS presidency in 2014. Accordingly, starting from April 2014, Ukraine's cooperation within the CIS has been reduced to a minimum. Ukraine withdrew from a number of multilateral agreements within the framework of the CIS and ceased membership in many bodies of industry cooperation.

As of 2019, Ukraine had minimized its participation in the Commonwealth to the critically necessary minimum. However, the review of 236 agreements, which Ukraine joined during its participation in the CIS, is ongoing, with the aim of denouncing them.

On February 19, 2019, the executive committee of the Commonwealth of Independent States sent an invitation to participate in the meeting of the Council of Heads of State, which was held on October 11, 2019, in Ashgabat, to the President of Ukraine Volodymyr Zelenskyi and the head of the Ministry of Foreign Affairs of Ukraine Vadym Prystaiko. However, Kyiv did not respond to the invitation.

On September 2, 2020, Ukraine stopped participating in the agreement on cooperation in the field of veterinary medicine, in the field of sanitary protection of the territories of the CIS member states, and the agreement on the establishment of the Coordinating Council for Plant Quarantine of the CIS member states. In February 2021, Ukraine withdrew from two CIS agreements concerning the common airspace and its use.

On February 16, 2022, the Verkhovna Rada of Ukraine supported the termination of the international agreement regarding Ukraine's participation in the Anti-Terrorist Center of the Commonwealth of Independent States. The People's Deputies also voted for the document, which provides for withdrawal from the agreement on the rules for determining the origin of developing goods, when granting tariff preferences within the framework of the general system of preferences. It was signed on April 12, 1996, in Moscow and ratified by the Verkhovna Rada on November 22, 2002.

After the Russian invasion 

After the beginning of the Russian invasion of Ukraine during the Russo-Ukrainian War, Russia–Ukraine relations were completely broken, and Belarus–Ukraine relations, due to the Belarusian involvement in the 2022 Russian invasion of Ukraine as an ally of the Russian Federation, deteriorated extremely. Moreover, Ukraine began intensive denunciation of various agreements with the CIS due to European integration and the process of accession of Ukraine to the European Union.

On May 22, 2022, the Verkhovna Rada of Ukraine adopted 4 draft laws on the denunciation of agreements with the CIS: on agreements on the common agricultural market of the CIS member states, on avoiding double taxation, on the fight against illegal migration and perpetuating the memory of the courage and heroism of the peoples of the CIS in the Great Patriotic War (274 votes).

On June 15, 2022, Ukraine withdrew from the CIS agreement on the establishment of the Council of Heads of Higher Arbitration, Economic, Economic and Other Courts that resolve cases related to disputes in the field of economy.

On June 19, 2022, the Verkhovna Rada of Ukraine approved the withdrawal from the agreement on cooperation in the development and use of cellular mobile communication systems. The parliament also voted for Law No. 0103 on withdrawal from the agreement on the creation of an intergovernmental reserve of biological preparations and other means of animal protection in the CIS. Ukraine also withdrew from the protocol on amendments to the Agreement on intergovernmental field service communication for the delivery of official correspondence of the CIS bodies, which concerned the right of employees to keep and use service weapons in accordance with national legislation. In addition, the parliament supported draft law No. 0147 on withdrawal from the agreement on support and development of small entrepreneurship in the CIS. At the meeting, the Verkhovna Rada also adopted Law No. 0149 on the termination of the agreement between the Government of Ukraine and the Government of the Russian Federation on scientific and technical cooperation.

On July 18, 2022, the Verkhovna Rada of Ukraine adopted the Law of Ukraine introduced by the Cabinet of Ministers of Ukraine "On Withdrawal from the Agreement on Cooperation and Mutual Assistance in Customs Matters of April 15, 1994" concluded in Moscow and ratified by the Verkhovna Rada of Ukraine in 1999.

The status of Ukraine in the CIS 

On December 8, 1991, the President of Ukraine, Leonid Kravchuk, signed the Agreement on the Establishment of the Commonwealth of Independent States, according to which Ukraine became one of the founding states of the CIS. This Agreement was ratified by the Verkhovna Rada of Ukraine on December 10, 1991, with reservations. On December 20, 1991, the Verkhovna Rada of Ukraine made a statement "On Ukraine's conclusion of the Agreement on the Commonwealth of Independent States". According to the last paragraph of this Statement, its provisions are the official interpretation of the above Agreement. On December 21, 1991, Ukraine signed the Protocol to the Agreement on the Establishment of the Commonwealth of Independent States, which is an integral part of it.

In the specified documents, which are decisive for Ukraine regarding its participation in the CIS, there is no mention of associate membership in this interstate entity. Also, the above-mentioned Agreement and Protocol do not provide for the possibility of associate membership.

On January 22, 1993, the CIS Charter was adopted by the decision of the Council of Heads of State of the CIS. This decision was not signed by Ukraine.

According to the first part of Article 8 of the CIS Charter, "on the basis of a decision of the Council of Heads of State, a state that wishes to participate in certain types of its activities may join the Commonwealth as an associate member under the conditions determined by the agreement on associate membership." Ukraine did not sign the agreement on associate membership in accordance with the CIS Statute.

Article 7 of the Charter defines that "the founding states of the Commonwealth are the states that signed and ratified the Agreement on the Establishment of the CIS and the Protocol thereto. CIS member states are those founding states that undertake obligations under the CIS Charter within one year after its adoption by the Council of Heads of State.

Thus, Ukraine is one of the founding states of the Commonwealth of Independent States, but was not a member state of the CIS as such, as it did not sign the Decision on Adoption of the CIS Statute. Ukraine ceased its participation in the statutory bodies of the CIS in 2018 due to the protracted Russo-Ukrainian War, although it remains a member of the Commonwealth of Independent States Free Trade Area.

Exit of Ukraine from the CIS 
Ukraine has never been a member of the CIS, as it had not ratified the CIS Charter.  However, to fully terminate its relationship with the CIS, it would need to legally withdraw from the Creation Agreement, which it has not done.

The question of Ukraine's membership in the CIS was raised for the first time after Viktor Yushchenko's victory in the 2004 presidential election. In 2005, the Minister of Foreign Affairs of Ukraine B. Tarasiuk noted that Ukraine's participation in the CIS is symbolic, and the very existence of the organization and its further development is very problematic. A similar point of view was also expressed by the representatives of the Georgian, Moldovan and Azerbaijani governments. In July 2007, at a press conference, the President of Ukraine, Viktor Yushchenko, regarded the prospects of the CIS as a whole as pessimistic.

Another reason was the beginning of Russo-Ukrainian War in the east. On 14 March 2014, a bill was introduced to Ukraine's parliament to denounce their ratification of the CIS Creation Agreement, but it did not go through all the necessary committee review procedures and was never voted on.  Bills were also introduced later that year to suspend application of the Creation Agreement and invalidate the Verkhovna Rada's ratification of the agreement, but were not approved.  On March 19, 2014, the National Security and Defense Council of Ukraine decided to start the procedure for leaving the CIS. On April 30, 2014, the Ministry of Foreign Affairs of Ukraine announced that they had already prepared all the necessary documents regarding Ukraine's withdrawal from the CIS. After that, according to Deputy Minister of Foreign Affairs Danylo Lubkivskyi, the only thing necessary for Ukraine to leave this association is the appropriate law.

Following the 2014 parliamentary election, a new bill to denounce the CIS agreement was introduced.

In September 2015, the Ukrainian Ministry of Foreign Affairs confirmed Ukraine will continue taking part in the CIS "on a selective basis".  Since that month, Ukraine has had no representatives in the CIS Executive Committee building. 

In April 2018, Ukrainian President Petro Poroshenko indicated that Ukraine would formally leave the CIS. As of 1 June, the CIS secretariat had not received formal notice from Ukraine of its withdrawal from the CIS, a process that will take one year to complete, following notice being given.

On April 12, 2018, President of Ukraine Petro Poroshenko announced that he would propose to the Verkhovna Rada to withdraw from all statutory bodies of the CIS. On May 19, 2018, President of Ukraine Petro Poroshenko signed the Decree, which implemented the decision of the National Security and Defense Council of Ukraine on the final termination of Ukraine's participation in the statutory bodies of the CIS.

Ukraine has further stated that it intends to review its participation in all CIS agreements and only continue in those that are in its interests.  It has also withdrawn from various agreements adopted within the framework of the commonwealth, but continues to be a party to various other agreements. This is due to the fact that in the "post-Soviet space" some issues that are really important to Ukrainians are still regulated by CIS agreements. For example, pension provision, recognition of diplomas, legal aid, etc., that is, all these things are really important for Ukrainians.

See also 

 Eurasianism
 Russian world
 Russification of Ukraine
 Russia–Ukraine relations
 Belarus–Ukraine relations
 Ukraine–European Union relations
 Ukraine–NATO relations

References

External links 

 HISTORY OF UKRAINE'S PARTICIPATION in the Commonwealth of Independent States relations
 Law of Ukraine On the Ratification of the Agreement on the Principles of Formation of a Common Transport Space and Cooperation of the Commonwealth of Independent States Member States in the Field of Transport Policy
 Law of Ukraine On the Ratification of the Agreement on the Creation of a Free Trade Zone and the Protocol on Amendments and Supplements to the Agreement on the Creation of a Free Trade Zone

 
Commonwealth
Commonwealth
Third-country relations of the Commonwealth of Independent States